Bulbophyllum pungens is a species of orchid in the genus Bulbophyllum. Its petals are often blue-green.

References
The Bulbophyllum-Checklist
The Internet Orchid Species Photo Encyclopedia

pungens